Liburd Algernon Henry (born 29 August 1967 in Roseau, Dominica) is a former professional association football player.  He played for Halifax Town, Watford, Maidstone United, Gillingham, Dover Athletic and Peterborough United between 1988 and 1995.

References

1967 births
Living people
Dominica footballers
Gillingham F.C. players
Colchester United F.C. players
Millwall F.C. players
Watford F.C. players
Halifax Town A.F.C. players
Maidstone United F.C. (1897) players
Peterborough United F.C. players
Dagenham & Redbridge F.C. players
Welling United F.C. players
Dover Athletic F.C. players
People from Roseau
Association football forwards